Kyoko Katashita (片下恭子 Katashita Kyoko, born July 13, 1989) is a Japanese volleyball player who played for Victorina Himeji.

Profiles
She became a volleyball player at 6 years old.  While attending high school, the volleyball team won the top of Japanese high school with Yuki Kawai.

Clubs
 Higashikyushu Ryukoku High School → Denso Airybees (2008-)
 Victorina Himeji - (2018–2019)

National team
 Junior national team (2007)

Honors
Team
Japan Volleyball League/V.League/V.Premier　Runners-up (1): 2007-2008
Kurowashiki All Japan Volleyball Championship　Champions (1): 2008
 Japan V.League Division 2　Champions (1): 2018-2019
Individual
2008 - Kurowashiki All Japan Volleyball Championship Best Libero awards

References

External links
FIVB Biography
Denso Official Website Profile

Japanese women's volleyball players
Living people
1989 births